Cadeaux is a collaborative indie rock project from Los Angeles, CA. Members include Briana Lane of Winslow and Darian Zahedi of CRX.

Their first single "Bad" was released on September 17, 2020. The song was mixed by production veteran Shane Stoneback (Vampire Weekend, Cults, Rostam). On December 30, 2020, the track became KCRW's Top Tune of the Day. Cadeaux released its next single Either Way on February 24, 2022. Lane said in an interview on March 23, 2022 that Cadeaux would release several new tracks in 2022. 

The video for "Bad" was directed by film and TV director Brea Grant.

Discography

Band members 

 Briana Lane 
 Darian Zahedi

References 

Indie rock musical groups from California